Galle railway station is a railway station in the southern city of Galle in Sri Lanka.  Owned by Sri Lanka Railways, the state-run railway operator, the station is part of the Coast Line, which links Sri Lanka's south coast with the Colombo.

Location
Galle Station is located in the centre of Galle.  It is just northwest of the Galle International Cricket Ground.  Galle's City Hall is next to the station and the historic Galle Fort is a short distance from the station.

Layout

Galle station is designed as a terminus station. Thus trains have to back out of the station to continue towards an onward destination. Passengers enter the station from the south and trains approach from the north.

The station's terminal layout has posed some problems in its operation, since all trains have to change directions and reverse out of the station to continue on to their destinations.  This can cause long turn-around times and it places the passengers in the opposite direction of where they had been facing.

In 2011, diesel multiple units (DMU) were introduced, as part of a line upgrade.  The DMUs reduce turn-around times as locomotives do not need to run around and change ends.

Architecture

Galle station is an example of Modernism.  The station conforms to the International Style, and uses concrete massing to create a geometric form.  Its minimalist walls and simple, bold forms offer a contrast from the highly ornamented, traditional and colonial architecture that surrounds it. Yet the building is symmetric, to tie back to the surrounding architecture and facilitate movement through the building towards the platforms. This contributes to the station's layout as a terminus station. The façade also demonstrates a contrast between the use of different materials. The ornament-free painted surface provides a contrast with the natural stone surface.

The portion of the building that houses the platforms is of a different, more utilitarian design.  This features a metal structure that only covers the platforms, but not the trains.

Services

Galle station is served by the Ruhunu Kumari, Galu Kumari, and Samudra Devi trains.  Various other services also operate at Galle.  Local trains within the Southern Province connect Galle with Matara, calling at local stations along the route.

Inter-city trains

Local trains

Continuity

See also 

 List of railway stations in Sri Lanka
 List of railway stations by line order in Sri Lanka

References

Railway stations in Galle
Railway stations on the Coastal Line